George Mihalka (born 1953) is a Hungarian-born Canadian filmmaker.  He is known for his 1981 slasher film My Bloody Valentine which was remade in 2009.

Career
In Canada since 1963, George Mihalka studied film at Concordia University in Montreal, Quebec. In 1981, he directed My Bloody Valentine, a low-budget ‘slasher’ for Paramount that was a modest box office hit. He has since directed in Quebec, Europe and the U.S., moving with ease from French to English, comedy to drama, theatrical features to episodic television. His 1993 satirical feature, La Florida, about Quebec snowbirds, was a huge hit in that province and the Golden Reel Award winner for the highest-grossing Canadian film of the year.

Filmography
Pick-up Summer (1980)
My Bloody Valentine (1981)
Scandale (1982)
The Blue Man (1985)
Shades of Love: Midnight Magic (1988)
Office Party (1988)
Le chemin de Damas (1988)
Crossbow: The Movie (1989)
Straight Line (1990)
Psychic (1991)
The Final Heist (1991)
La Florida (1993)
Relative Fear (1994)Deceptions II: Edge of Deception (1995)Bullet to Beijing (1995)The Ideal Man (1996)Windsor Protocol (1996)Thunder Point (1998)Dr Lucille: The Lucille Teasdale Story (2001)Watchtower (2001)Les Boys IV (2005)Sticks and Stones (2008)Bloodlust: My Bloody Valentine and the Rise of the Slasher Film (2009)Faith, Fraud, & Minimum Wage (2011)Black Christmas Legacy (2015)Needles'' (TBA)

References

External links

Hungarian film directors
Film directors from Montreal
Horror film directors
Living people
1953 births
Hungarian television directors
Canadian television directors
Hungarian emigrants to Canada